The Hunger Games: Catching Fire – Original Motion Picture Soundtrack is the official soundtrack to the 2013 American science-fiction adventure film The Hunger Games: Catching Fire. The movie is an adaptation of the 2009 novel by Suzanne Collins and the sequel of The Hunger Games. The soundtrack was released through Republic Records on November 15, 2013.

The album sold 151,000 copies in the US in 2013, making it the seventh best-selling soundtrack album for the year.

Promotion
On May 14, 2013, Alexandra Patsavas was listed in the credits as the new music supervisor, replacing T Bone Burnett from the first film. Christina Aguilera announced over Twitter on September 26, 2013 that her new song, "We Remain", would be part of the official soundtrack of the film. On September 26, as a part of the #ticktock campaign for The Hunger Games: Catching Fire, #ticktock9 revealed the artwork and track-listing to the soundtrack of the film.

Singles
"Atlas", written and performed by British alternative rock band Coldplay (who also co-wrote the song "We're a Team" for the Hunger Games Score), was released as the lead single from the soundtrack on September 6, 2013. The single charted high in many countries, including a debut at #12 on the UK Singles Chart, and peaking at #3 in the Netherlands and #9 in Italy. A lyric video for the song was also released alongside the single on the day of release. It features an art style reflecting the imagery of The Hunger Games. "Atlas" is one of only four songs on the album to actually be used in the film; the others are "Silhouettes", "Gale Song" and "Who We Are."

"Elastic Heart", performed by Australian recording artist Sia, was released as the second single from the soundtrack on October 1, 2013. It has charted on the Australian, UK and New Zealand music charts, the latter mentioned having greater success, peaking at number 7. The song later went on to be included on Sia's sixth studio album, 1000 Forms of Fear as a solo version, which charted at number 17 on the Billboard Hot 100 and number 10 on the UK Official Chart.

"We Remain", performed by American singer Christina Aguilera, was released as the third single from the soundtrack on October 1, 2013.

Track listing

Charts

Year-end charts

Release history

References

The Hunger Games music
2013 soundtrack albums
Science fiction film soundtracks
Adventure film soundtracks